Robert Charles "Bobby, Shaky" Walton (August 5, 1912 – September 3, 1992) was a Canadian professional ice hockey forward who played four games in the National Hockey League for the Montreal Canadiens. Walton was also a star on the AHL Pittsburgh Hornets. He is the father of the NHL hockey player, Mike Walton.

External links

1912 births
1992 deaths
Buffalo Bisons (AHL) players
Canadian ice hockey forwards
Cleveland Barons (1937–1973) players
Ice hockey people from Ottawa
Montreal Canadiens players
Pittsburgh Hornets players
Washington Lions players